Paradise Grove is an independent 2003 black comedy filmed in London. Much of the film is based in a fictional Jewish retirement home. It stars Ron Moody and Rula Lenska. It was directed by Charles Harris and was his first feature film.

Synopsis
A quirky film about life, death, and the bit in the middle, Paradise Grove is a beguiling blend of tragedy, romance, and wry Jewish wit. Set in an eccentric north London Jewish old age home, the film revolves around three generations of the same family. There's cantankerous old Izzie Goldberg (Ron Moody), who's dying and is not at all happy about it, his hedonistic daughter Dee (Rula Lenska), the home's owner, a cross between a Sixties flower child and a traditional Jewish mother—and there's her teenage age son Keith (Leyland O'Brien), the mixed-race outcome of a disastrous marriage. Keith's identity crisis forms the film's emotional core: he's trying to build personal and religious bridges with his grandfather while starting a relationship with the mysterious Kim (Lee Blakemore), who turns up one morning looking for shelter, and who offers the promise of a life outside Paradise Grove. He'd love to get away from his domineering mother but can he abandon Izzie? And why does Kim keep a loaded gun in her handbag?

Reception

Reviews
"Sensitively moving between playful humour and serious drama..." Raindance Film Festival

"A jewel that will shine for years to come..." Notes From Hollywood

"Sharply observed and often hilarious..." London Jewish Chronicle

Accolades
The film garnered several awards and nominations;

WINNER
BEST NEW DIRECTOR
CHARLES HARRIS
(Palm Springs Festival of Festivals)

TOP FIVE
AUDIENCE FAVORITES
(Palm Springs Festival of Festivals)

WINNER
BRONZE AWARD FOR FIRST FILM
(Houston WorldFest)

TOP THREE
AUDIENCE FAVOURITES
(Commonwealth Film Festival)

NOMINATED
BEST FILM
(British Independent Film Awards)

References

External links 
 
 

2003 films
2003 comedy-drama films
British comedy-drama films
British black comedy films
British independent films
Films about Jews and Judaism
2003 black comedy films
2003 independent films
2000s English-language films
2000s British films